Fullhurst Community College is an over-subscribed 11-16 comprehensive school in Braunstone, West Leicester. In January 2018 Ofsted graded the school ‘Good’, which reflects the continued improvements the school has made and the record summer examinations results over the last three years. The current Executive Headteacher is Mrs Christina Bailey. 
  
Fullhurst Community College opened in 1991 following the closure of King Richard III School and Newarke School.  It was initially located on the King Richard site while a significant refurbishment of the Newarke site took place.  It moved into the Newarke buildings in 1992. After this, the college received funding from the Building Schools For The Future programme. Under this, DRCC retained its 1930s red bricks and clocktower, and was combined with a new, glass building and 21st century facilities to allow students to thrive. Recently, DRCC has inhabited Ellesmere College's old building, and turned it into a £15 million new campus to house Year 7 and Year 8 students, also allowing the college to expand its student population to 1500 from September 2020.

The school has also won awards such as the Department For Education Pupil Premium Secondary Champion, Leicester Mercury School Of The Year, and finalists for the Pearson's 2018 National School Of The Year.

Notable pupils

King Richard III Secondary School
 Claudia Webbe, MP for Leicester East since 2019

References

External links
 School website

Secondary schools in Leicester
Foundation schools in Leicester